"JTR" is a song by Dave Matthews Band from their unreleased album, The Lillywhite Sessions. The song originated from "John the Revelator," a song written by Dave Matthews with the help from Carlos Santana.  Matthews and Santana wrote "John the Revelator" as a love song about someone calling out to their unattainable lover.  The "John the Revelator" lines that originally appeared in the song were suggested by Santana who got the idea from the traditional gospel song of the same name.

History
"JTR" began as "John the Revelator," which first appeared live as a tease played twice during a show on November 30, 1998.  Afterwards, the song was played in full a total five times – twice in acoustic set by Matthews and Tim Reynolds, and three times with the full band and various guests, such as The Lovely Ladies, Béla Fleck, and the band Santana.  After its final performance in May 1999, the song was taken to the recording studio with producer Steve Lillywhite in the beginning of 2000.  The band reworked "John the Revelator" by changing a few chords, and most notably, dropping a portion of the chorus, which contained the following verse:

Since the title's line was dropped from the lyrics, the band renamed the song to "JTR" and recorded it for the album which eventually became leaked on the internet as The Lillywhite Sessions.

Although the band never officially released the song, "JTR" began showing in live setlists on the band's summer tour in 2000.  The song became popular among fans and was played live during many shows up until the end of the summer tour in 2001, following the release of Everyday.  A performance of the song was recorded for the live album and video, Live at Folsom Field, Boulder, Colorado, along with many songs from Everyday.

In 2002, Dave Matthews Band went back into the recording studio to rerecord the songs for their album Busted Stuff, which previously leaked out as The Lillywhite Sessions.  According to producer Stephen Harris, "JTR" was abandoned very early in the studio, and therefore did not appear on the album.  Following the recording sessions, the song was no longer played live, except for a small tease during a show in 2003.  In an interview in July 2004, bassist Stefan Lessard claimed that the band agreed that they did not like "JTR," and that it would probably never be played again.

Despite Lessard's comment about the band's feeling towards the song in 2004, "JTR" was once again played live for the first time in over five years during an encore at the New Orleans Jazz & Heritage Festival, about one month before the band's summer tour in 2006.  The performance was a surprise to many fans who thought the song would never again be played, especially after the comment made by Lessard two years earlier. The song was once again brought back to setlists and was played 17 times during the tour with guest Rashawn Ross, including one performance where it was the opening song.  In response to many fans' comments about how Lessard claimed the song was dead, Lessard posted a bulletin on his MySpace page saying that he didn't recall saying so, and he was most likely being sarcastic if he did.

After another absence of three years from setlists, "JTR" was once again played live to open the 2010 summer tour at the Comcast Theatre in Hartford, CT, and was part of setlist rotation for the rest of the tour. After being absent in from setlists in 2011 and 2012, JTR returned on May 26, 2013. After a few more plays in 2013, the song went away again until 2018, where it was played twice.

"JTR" was played once during the 2019 Europe tour, marking the first time since 2000 and 2001 that the song had been played in consecutive years. On May 18, 2019 in Dallas, due to the ongoing thunderstorm and fan requests, the song was played despite not being on the planned setlist. JTR was again played in Charlotte, NC on July 19, 2019, immediately after a prolonged lightning delay.

Live releases
In addition to the performance from the live album and video, Live at Folsom Field, Boulder, Colorado, live versions of "JTR" also appears on 2004's exclusive release for members of the Warehouse Fan Association, as well as the live albums, Live Trax Vol. 3, Live Trax Vol. 11, Live Trax Vol. 16, Live Trax Vol. 31, and Live Trax Vol. 45.

References

Dave Matthews Band songs
2000 songs
Songs written by Dave Matthews